Terra Encantada was an amusement park in Barra da Tijuca, Rio de Janeiro, Brazil, which operated from 1998 to 2010. The 200-sq. kilometer park was themed to the people and festivals of Brazilian culture, as well as the origins of Brazilian culture: indigenous, African and European.

History
The park planned to have more than 60 dining options, including a Planet Hollywood location. Investments reached $220 million USD and the park received funding from the National Bank for Economic Development. More than 12 thousand people would be employed directly and indirectly and 20 thousand people were expected to visit the park every day. Revenue was expected to be about $30 million monthly. However, many of these plans would not pan out.

The park's opening was delayed twice, from its original date on October 12, 1997 to December 15 and eventually to January 15, 1998. Upon its opening, not all of the attractions were open. The first visitors, disappointed, demanded refunds. While at the park's opening party, actress Isis de Oliveira was injured on one of the main attractions of the park. She subsequently sued for damages. Other disturbances included fights between jiu-jitsu entertainers and a strike by employees.

On March 17, 2002, during a party at the park for freshmen at the Estácio de Sá University, a brawl erupted during a performance by rock band Charlie Brown Jr. The brawl started after the singer left the stage, and the park asked the band to continue playing in hopes of mitigating damage. 61 people were injured, shops were destroyed and looted, and stones, chairs, trash cans and potted plants were thrown everywhere.

In 2005 a 28-year-old man fell from one of the roller coasters, suffering lung perforation and fractures in his skull and cervical spine.

In 2009 the Public Ministry opened an investigation into the park after receiving a complaint of its unsafe condition. However, little action was taken beyond an initial investigation and report. Another complaint was made in 2009 after employees continued to sell tickets to visitors during a power outage despite the rides and attractions not functioning.

That same year, the park was chosen to be the filming location for the soap opera "Bela, a Feia ", and all of Main Street was changed to resemble the old Rio de Janeiro neighborhood of Gamboa. The location was leased until July 2010.

On June 19, 2010, 61 year-old visitor Heydiara Lemos Ribeiro was thrown from Mount Aurora, and died from head trauma. The park continued to operate for several more months while investigations were carried out. The subsequent investigations discovered that the park's rides all had serious structural and mechanical issues, which led to a total shutdown of the park. The park's director and engineers were charged with manslaughter in 2011, although this charge would later be aquitted in 2013. The park would only be able to reopen when the demands made by the Civil Defense were fulfilled.

The park closed in 2010. There was a fire on the property in 2014, in a building used for movie screenings. Demolition of the site began in 2016.

Characters
The main character was Kiara, queen of the park, who was a water goddess inspired by the mythological figures of iaras and kitutas. Tunhã was a golden lion tamarin and Aurora was a Spix's macaw. The character João do Mato prevented deforestation.

Thematic areas

Terra Encantada was divided into different thematic areas that depicted the origins of the Brazilian people.

Main Street
The main street contained bars, restaurants, and most of the shops in the park, all with facades in various styles of Brazilian architecture.

Attractions
 Portal das Trevas, ghost maze where not touch the monsters, or they will touch you.
 Cine 3D, feel in a movie with amazing 3D effects.

Trivia
 Cine IMAX, IMAX Cinema was the first film of its kind in Brazil. The KODAK company sent the wrong tape, but when he learned of the crisis of the park they did not send the correct tape. The space is completed, but does not work today.

Terra Européia (Europe Land)
Inspired by European culture.

The area included a small Zamperia roller coaster.

Attractions
 Cabhum, this tower of 67 meters, which equates to a building of 22 floors, offers participants the experience of a free fall at 100 km per hour. Similar to The Twilight Zone - Tower of Terror at Disney's Hollywood Studios. Manufactured by Intamin.
 Chega Mais,  modern version of "silkworm", brings together music and speed on trails, in addition to rotate forward and backward.
 Tornado, a flying carousel popularly known as "Mexican hat" in this toy, plus the feeling of flying, has a view of the entire park.

Terra das Crianças (Children's Land)
Children's land had a teacup ride (with water lilies instead of tea cups), a carousel, and a mini roller coaster manufactured by Zamperia. Also present were an ecological-themed playground, a kart racing track, and a house of mirrors.

Attractions
 Trem Fantasma, a scary ghost train where all the dead come to life.
 Teco-Teco, authentic reproductions of planes biplane, flying up and down, with control of the kids.

Terra dos Índios (Land of the Indians)

Honoring the indigenous peoples of Brazil.

Attraction
Corredeiras, a large channel with 600 meters in length where a passenger boat with 9 wins the rapids of a wild river. Similar to the Congo River from Busch Gardens, Florida / USA. Manufactured by Intamin.

Terra Africana (African Land)

The objective of the creation of this thematic area is to show how African culture influenced the formation of the Brazilian people. The main roller coaster in the park, Monte Makaya,  was located in this area. It held the record for most inversions in the world (8) for four years, before it was surpassed by Colossus at Thorpe Park.

The area also included bumper cars and a caravel ride.

Castelo das Águas (The Water Castle)

With plans to open in 1999, the Castle of Waters would have a surprise inside, a roller coaster in the dark. Unfortunately these projects were discontinued. The roller coaster was relocated to Europe Land as Monte Aurora.

Food

Terra Encantada had three primary dining options:

 Filé Miau, cafeteria located in the Euroupe Land
 Looping Kids, cafeteria located in the exit of Monte Makaya
 Nippon Box, cafeteria located on Earth African

Music 
The park had a musical trio, also called Terra Encantada, which performed songs to promote the park.

References

Amusement parks in Brazil
Defunct amusement parks
Parks in Rio de Janeiro (city)
Tourist attractions in Rio de Janeiro (city)
1998 establishments in Brazil
2010 disestablishments in Brazil
Amusement parks opened in 1998
Amusement parks closed in 2010